The Occaneechi (also Occoneechee and Akenatzy) are Native Americans who lived in the 17th century primarily on the large,  long Occoneechee Island and east of the confluence of the Dan and Roanoke rivers, near current-day Clarksville, Virginia. They spoke one of the Siouan languages, and thus related to the Saponi, Tutelo, Eno and other Southeastern Siouan-language peoples living in the Piedmont region of present-day North Carolina and Virginia.

In 1676, in the course of Bacon's Rebellion, the tribe was attacked by militias from the Colony of Virginia and decimated. Also under demographic pressure from European settlements and newly introduced infectious diseases, the Saponi and Tutelo came to live near the Occaneechi on adjacent islands. By 1714 the Occaneechi moved to join the Tutelo, Saponi, and other Siouan people living on a  reservation in current-day Brunswick County, Virginia. It included a fort called Christanna. The Siouan people had been drastically reduced to approximately 600 people. Fort Christanna was closed in 1717, after which there are few written references to the Occaneechi. Colonists recorded that they left the area in 1740 and migrated north for protection with the Iroquois.

During the 19th and 20th centuries, some remnant Siouan peoples gathered together and worked to retain their identity as Native Americans. In the late 20th century, they organized as the self-named Occaneechi Band of the Saponi Nation. In 2002 the tribe was formally recognized by the state of North Carolina. The members of the tribe live primarily in Alamance and Orange Counties.

Name
The meaning and origin of the name Occaneechi is unknown. They have also historically been called the Achonechy, Aconechos, Akenatzy, Akenatzy's, Hockinechy, Occaneches, Occaanechy, Occhonechee, Occonacheans, Occoneechee, Ockanechees, Ockanigee, Okenechee, Acconeechy, Occaneeches, Ochineeches, and Ockinagee.

History

17th century
The Occaneechi were first written about in 1650, by English explorer Edward Bland. He wrote that they lived on the Trading Path that connected Virginia with the interior of North America. Their position on the Trading Path gave the Occaneechi the power to act as trading "middlemen" between Virginia and various tribes to the west. In 1673, Abraham Wood, a Virginian fur trader, sent James Needham and Gabriel Arthur into the southern Appalachian Mountains in an attempt to make direct contact with the Cherokee, thus bypassing the Occaneechi. The party did make contact with the Cherokee. It was not until the last decades of the 17th century, when South Carolina colonists established a strong relationship with the Cherokee and other interior tribes, that the Occaneechi role as trading middleman was undermined.

In May 1676, the Occaneechi allied with Nathaniel Bacon and his British troops in a war with the Susquehannock; however, the British immediately turned on their allies and attacked three forts within the Occaneechi village. The British killed the Occaneechi's leader Posseclay, approximately one hundred men, as well as many women and children. A Susquehannock war party attacked Occoneechee Island in the summer of 1678.

18th century
In 1701 John Lawson visited the Occaneechi village, located on the Eno River near present-day Hillsborough, North Carolina. His written report plus modern archaeological research at the site give insight into a society undergoing rapid change. They also were working to continue traditional crafts and a way of life.

Historian Robert Beverley, Jr., in his History and Present State of Virginia (1705), wrote that the Occaneechi language was widely used as a lingua franca, "understood by the chief men of many nations, as Latin is in many parts of Europe" — even though, he says, the Occaneechi "have been but a small nation, ever since those parts were known to the English." Beverley said that the "priests and conjurers" of the other Virginia Indian tribes "perform their adorations and conjurations" in this general language, much "as the Catholics of all nations do their Mass in the Latin."  Linguistic scholars believe that the Occaneechi spoke a dialect of the Siouan language Tutelo.

Virginia governor Alexander Spotswood mentioned the Occaneechi as being one of nine Native nations within Virginia in 1712. Along with the "Stuckanok, Tottero, and Saponi," the Occaneechi signed a "Treaty of Peace" with the colony of Virginia in 1713. They moved to Fort Christanna in southeast Virginia. Occaneechi Town was almost entirely abandoned by 1713.

Fort Christanna was operated by the Virginia Company from 1714 to 1717. Its closure was apparently due to a lack of profits as an Indian trading center. Although several distinct groups of Siouan Indians lived at Fort Christanna, the English Virginians tended to refer to them simply as "Saponi" or "Fort Christanna Indians."  After the closing of Fort Christanna in 1717, colonial records contain few references to the Occaneechi. Those references that do exist indicate a continued trade between Virginia colonists and the Saponi and Occaneechi.

By 1720, after ongoing losses from warfare, the remnant bands of the Occaneechi, Saponi, and Stukanox, "who not finding themselves Separately Numerous, enough for their Defence, have agreed to unite in one Body, and all of them now go under the Name of the Sapponeys, as William Byrd II wrote.

In 1727, a settler living near the Iroquoian Meherrin, in a region where some violence had broken out, wrote to the governor of Virginia about the events. He said the Meherrin denied attacking the Nottoway (another Iroquoian tribe).  "[T]hey lay the whole blame upon the Occaneechy King and the Saponi Indians."  This suggests that English settlers recognized a distinction between the Occaneechi and Saponi.

In 1730 Virginia's House of Burgesses records noted an "Interpreter to the Saponi and Occaneechi Indians." This implied the existence of monoglot Occaneechi people. In 1730, many Saponi moved to live among the Catawba in South Carolina, but most returned to Virginia in 1733, along with some Cheraw Indians. After 1733 the Saponi appear to have fragmented into small groups and dispersed. Some apparently remained in the vicinity of Fort Christanna, which was noted in Virginia records by its Saponi name, Junkatapurse. After 1742 the settlement is no longer mentioned, but only a road called Junkatapurse.
In the 1740s, the Saponi migrated south to live with the Catawba. Governor Gooch of Virginia reported that the "Saponies and other petty nations associated with them ... are retired out of Virginia to the Cattawbas" during the years 1743-1747.

Most of the remaining Saponi members were recorded as migrating north in 1740 for protection with the Iroquois. They mostly disappeared from the historical record in the Southeast. After the American Revolution, in which four of the Iroquois Six Nations had sided with the losing British, the majority of the Iroquois (and Saponi) went to Canada for resettlement. Descendants live mostly at the Six Nations of the Grand River First Nation reserve in Ontario. Traditional English-American histories typically describe the Saponi group of Indians as having left Virginia and North Carolina in the 18th century, either to join the Catawba or the Iroquois.

Starting in the middle of the 18th century, however, historic records note Saponi living in North Carolina. Some Saponi moved from Virginia to various places in North Carolina. There is some evidence that isolated Indians never left these areas of North Carolina and became consolidated with Saponi from Virginia.

In 1756, Moravian settlers living near present-day Winston-Salem reported an Indian palisaded "fort" settlement near the Haw River. The Moravians called the Indians "Cherokees", but it is more likely they were Sissipahau ("Saxapahaw") or another group related to the Occaneechi.  This, along with various oral traditions, indicates Indians' living in a more or less traditional manner in North Carolina's Piedmont after such settlements supposedly vanished.

In 1763, Lt. Governor Francis Fauquier of Virginia wrote a letter that included a description of the Indians of Virginia: "There are some of the Nottoways, Meherrins, Tuscaroras, and Saponys, who tho' they live in peace in the midst of us, lead in great measure the lives of wild Indians."  He contrasted these Indians with the Eastern Shore and Pamunkey Indians, whom he described as more assimilated to English ways. Thus, there are still indications of Saponi in Virginia during this period.

Archaeology
For years lay people and researchers have discovered thousands of artifacts from "Occoneechee Town," "Saponi Town" and "Tutelo Town" on islands in the Roanoke River near Clarksville, Virginia. Prior to the flooding of the islands in 1952, this was one of the richest archeology sites on the East Coast. Since 1983 the Research Laboratories of Anthropology at the University of North Carolina at Chapel Hill have been uncovering another "Occaneechi Town", a late 17th and early 18th century Occaneechi village on the Eno River near present-day Hillsborough, North Carolina.

Recent history
In 1995, a community centered around Pleasant Grove, North Carolina, descended from the Fort Christanna confederation of Occannechi, Saponi, and Tutelo began hosting an annual powwow and organized under the name Occaneechi Band of Saponi. They are recognized by the state of North Carolina and primarily reside in Alamance County.

The contemporary Occaneechi and Haliwa-Saponi tribes are mostly descendants of American Indian people who lived on the frontier of Virginia and North Carolina as early as the mid-to late 18th century. They migrated and acquired land as did European or English neighbors. They lived in close-knit communities, and in the middle-to-late 20th century the North Carolina and Virginia Piedmont Indian descendants officially reclaimed historical names such as Saponi and Occaneechi.

The Occaneechi Band of the Saponi Nation, now numbering 700, are the eighth and smallest tribe officially recognized by the state of North Carolina, receiving official status in 2002. The tribe presently owns  of land in NE Alamance County, North Carolina, where it is developing a tribal center.

Related Nations

 Catawba
 Cheraw
 Moneton
 Mosopelea
 Saponi
 Sewee
 Tutelo
 Waccamaw

Citations

See also
 List of Native American peoples in the United States

References
 Demallie, Raymond J. "Tutelo and Neighboring Groups." Sturtevant, William C., general editor and Raymond D. Fogelson, volume editor. Handbook of North American Indians: Southeast. Volume 14. Washington DC: Smithsonian Institution, 2004. .
 
 Lerch, Patricia B. "Indians of the Carolinas Since 1900." Sturtevant, William C., general editor and Raymond D. Fogelson, volume editor. Handbook of North American Indians: Southeast. Volume 14. Washington DC: Smithsonian Institution, 2004. .

External links
 The Occaneechi Band of the Saponi Nation
 Occaneechi Indian Tribe History, Access Genealogy
 Excavating Occaneechi Town: An archaeology primer, University of North Carolina
 The Historic Occaneechi: An Archaeological Investigation of Culture Change, Research Laboratories of Anthropology, UNC—Chapel Hill

Native American tribes in North Carolina
Native American tribes in Virginia
Pre-statehood history of Virginia
Pre-statehood history of North Carolina